Lazarevskaya railway station is a railway station of the North Caucasus Railway, subsidiary of Russian Railways, located in Lazarevskoye Microdistrict, Lazarevsky City District of the city of Sochi, Krasnodar Krai, Russia. The station was opened in 1918 and was renovated for the 2014 Winter Olympics.

References

Railway stations in Sochi
Railway stations in Russia opened in 1918